The third South American Junior Championships in Athletics were held in Santa Fe, Argentina from October 15–16, 1961.

Participation (unofficial)
Detailed result lists can be found on the "World Junior Athletics History" website.  An unofficial count yields the number of about 56 athletes from about 5 countries:  Argentina (21), Brazil (13), Chile (14), Peru (5), Uruguay (3).

Medal summary
Medal winners are published for men and women
Complete results can be found on the "World Junior Athletics History" website.

Men

Medal table (unofficial)

References

External links
World Junior Athletics History

South American U20 Championships in Athletics
1961 in Argentine sport
South American U20 Championships
International athletics competitions hosted by Argentina
1961 in South American sport
1961 in youth sport
October 1961 sports events in South America